Eileen Frances Stevens (born January 7, 1982) is an American actress based in New York City, having done voice work for 4Kids Entertainment, DuArt Film and Video and NYAV Post.  Stevens' first major role in an anime series was Belldandy in Ah! My Goddess. In 2011, she was cast as the lead role of Iris in Pokémon Black & White. Stevens has also voiced several Yu-Gi-Oh! anime characters, including Leo, Luna and Sherry LeBlanc (5D's; third season onwards), Tori Meadows (Zexal) and Sora Perse (Arc-V). Other than anime dubbing and theatre, Eileen has also done audiobooks and commercials.

Filmography

Animation 
 Ah! My Goddess – Belldandy, Hijiri
 Astonishing X-Men Motion Comics – Kitty Pryde
 Bakuman – Kayoko Mashiro (Credited as Julie Francis)
 Freedom – Chiyo, Additional Voices
 Gall Force: New Era – Pearl
 Ikki Tousen: Dragon Destiny – Bashoku, Koshaji, Shibai (credited as Julie Francis)
 Jurassic Cubs – Bronto
 King of Braves – GaoGaiGar – Ai Amami, Hana Hatsuno
 Mobile Suit Gundam Unicorn – Beltorchika Irma (Ep. 5), Additional Voices
 Let's Go! Tamagotchi – Ringotchi
 Shaggy & Scooby-Doo Get a Clue! – Additional Voices
 Pokémon – Iris and other voices (left the series in 2018 but returned in Journeys in 2021 to reprise her role as Iris and left again in season 25).
 Robin Hood: Mischief in Sherwood – Scarlett
 Reservor Dogs 2 – Shohsanam
 The Snow Queen 3: Fire and Ice – as Snow Queen
 Yoko – Oto, Ranger
 Winx Club (Nickelodeon, season 7) – Flora, Kalshara, Lockette,  Little girl with headband (7x20), Francine (7x25), Girl with purple hair and Narrator 
 World of Winx (English dub) – Flora, Sophie's Teacher (ep. 05), Mermaid #1 (2x13)
 Yu-Gi-Oh! (series)
 5D's – Leo, Luna (Season 3 onwards), Sherry LeBlanc
 Bonds Beyond Time – Leo, Luna, Yubel
 ZEXAL I & II – Tori Meadows, Mrs. Meadows, Lillybot
 ARC-V – Sora Perse, Olga

Stage/Theater 
 The Tragic and Horrible Life of the Singing Nun

Audiobooks 
 Dark Divine
 Ferdinand Madellan
 Girl Vs. Superstar
 Primary Source of The: Colonel History of Virginia
 Sealed with a Kiss
 Dumplin' (2015)
It Doesn't Have to Be Crazy at Work (2018)

References

External links 
 
 

American musical theatre actresses
American voice actresses
Living people
Actresses from New York City
Place of birth missing (living people)
21st-century American actresses
1982 births